LMM may refer to:

Los Mochis International Airport 
Luis Muñoz Marín, first democratically elected governor of Puerto Rico
Luis Muñoz Marín International Airport , locally nicknamed LMMA or LMMIA
Lightweight Multirole Missile, a product of Thales Air Defence Limited
London Music Masters, charity that supports the involvement of young musicians in classical music
Lucy Maud Montgomery (1874–1942), Canadian author
Lin-Manuel Miranda, American composer, rapper, lyricist, and actor
LIBOR market model, a financial model of interest rates
Linear multistep method, schemes used in mathematics to find numerical solutions of ordinary differential equations
 Mixed model, also called  linear mixed effects models (LMEMs), or shortened to linear mixed models (LMM)